Janice Mason (born 23 November 1959) is a Canadian former rower. She competed in the women's quadruple sculls event at the 1984 Summer Olympics.

References

External links
 

1959 births
Living people
Canadian female rowers
Olympic rowers of Canada
Rowers at the 1984 Summer Olympics
Sportspeople from Edmonton
World Rowing Championships medalists for Canada
20th-century Canadian women